Paolo Malco (born 10 April 1947) is an Italian film actor, best known for his roles in horror films, and later in many Italian TV mini-series.

From 1998 to 2006 he was cast in the drama Incantesimo.

Filmography 

1973: Number one - Teddy Garned
1974: Noa Noa - Williams
1974: The Sinful Nuns of Saint Valentine - Esteban
1974: Young Lucrezia - Juan de Candia Borgia
1975–1976: La traccia verde (TV Mini-Series) - John Ginsberg
1977: I Am Afraid - Caligari
1977: Il gatto dagli occhi di giada - Carlo
1977: Where the ravens fly silver
1979: Return of the Saint (TV Series) - Assassin
1979: Dolly sex blonde
1980: Masoch - Leopold
1981: The Wings of the Dove (TV Mini-Series) - Malcom Densher
1981: The House by the Cemetery - Dr. Norman Boyle
1982: The New York Ripper - Dr. Paul Davis
1982: Scorpion with Two Tails - Mike Grant
1983: Escape from the Bronx - Vice President Hoffman
1983: Thunder Warrior - Brian Sherman
1984: Tuareg - Il guerriero del deserto - Capt. Razman
1985: The Assisi Underground - Paolo Josza
1986: Midnight Killer - Inspector Piero Terzi
1986: Take the moon (TV Movie)
1988: Yellow Rule - Paolo Carbone
1988: La casa Dell'Orco (TV Series) - Tom
1990: Tre colonne in cronaca - Bruno Lachioma
1993: Delitti privati (TV Movie) - Tom
1997: L'avvocato delle donne (TV Mini-Series) - Vittorio Fieschi
1998: Incantesimo (TV Series) - Giuseppe Ansaldi
1998: Incantesimo 2 (TV Series) - Giuseppe Ansaldi
2000: Don Matteo (TV Series, first season, the episode entitled The blackmail)
2001: Turbo (TV Series, directed by Antonio Bonifacio) - Giacomo Marconi
2002: Incantesimo 5 (TV Series) - Giuseppe Ansaldi
2002: The house dell'angelo (TV Movie) - Luca Mayer
2003: Chiaroscuro (TV Movie) - Franceschini
2003: Incantesimo 6 (TV Series) - Giuseppe Ansaldi
2003: Claras Schatz (TV Movie) - Pietro Pinacoli
2004: Incantesimo 7 (TV Series) - Giuseppe Ansaldi
2005: Incantesimo 8 (TV Series) - Giuseppe Ansaldi
2006: Un giorno da leone 2 (TV Series)
2007: Barbara Wood: Sturmjahre (TV Movie) - James Morgan
2007: Who would have thought that ... (TV Movie) - Paolo
2007: A Room with a View (TV Movie) - Fabio
2008: Centovetrine (Soap Opera in progress)

External links

References

Living people
1947 births
Italian male actors